Raven Hawk is a 1996 TV action-drama film directed by Albert Pyun and starring Rachel McLish, John Enos III, Nicholas Guest, Vincent Klyn and Thom Mathews.

Plot
A Native American woman (Rachel McLish) is framed for the murder of her parents and forced to flee her reservation. Years later, she returns to exact revenge on the killers.

Cast 
 Rachel McLish as Rhyia Shadowfeather 
 John Enos III as Marshall Del Wilkes 
 Ed Lauter as Sheriff Daggert 
 Matt Clark as Ed Hudson 
 Michael Champion as Gordon Fowler 
 Mitch Pileggi as Carl Rikker 
 Mitch Ryan as White 
 Nicholas Guest as Larson 
 John de Lancie as Stansfield 
 Bill Bird as Houser 
 Virginia Capers as Dr. Helen Harris 
 John Fleck as Ed Kaplin 
 Thom Matthews as Stiles

References

External links
 

1996 television films
1996 films
Films directed by Albert Pyun
Neo-Western films
American action drama films
American action television films
American drama television films
1990s American films